Spartak Murtazayev (born 7 October 1977) is an Uzbekistan footballer currently playing for Kazakhstan Super League club FC Atyrau as a defender.

He was a member of the national team.

External links

1977 births
Living people
Sportspeople from Tashkent
Uzbekistani footballers
Uzbekistan international footballers
Expatriate footballers in Kazakhstan
Pakhtakor Tashkent FK players
Uzbekistani expatriate sportspeople in Kazakhstan
FK Dinamo Samarqand players
Association football defenders